JT Stratford & Son Ltd v Lindley [1965] AC 269 is a UK labour law case that concerns economic tort and strike action.

Facts
The union embargoed JT Stratford & Son, the parent company of a subsidiary that the union was in dispute with. They refused to handle the barges of JT Stratford.

Judgment
The House of Lords held

Lord Reid said the following.

It was not disputed that such interference is tortious if any unlawful means are employed.

See also

UK labour law
English tort law

Notes

English tort case law
United Kingdom labour case law
United Kingdom strike case law
House of Lords cases
1965 in case law
1965 in British law
1965 in labor relations